Below are the results of season nine of the World Poker Tour (2010–2011)

Results

WPT Grand Prix de Paris
 Casino: Aviation Club de France, Paris, France
 Buy-in: €10,000
 5-Day Event: May 8 – 15, 2010
 Number of Entries: 247
 Total Prize Pool: €2,347,797
 Number of Payouts: 27

WPT Spanish Championship
 Casino: Casino Barcelona, Barcelona, Spain
 Buy-in: €3,200 + €300
 5-Day Event: May 19 – 23, 2010
 Number of Entries: 326
 Total Prize Pool: €1,034,400
 Number of Payouts: 36

Bellagio Cup VI
 Casino: Bellagio, Las Vegas, Nevada
 Buy-in: $10,000 + 300
 6-Day Event: Jul 11 – 16, 2010
 Number of Entries: 353
 Total Prize Pool: $3,424,100
 Number of Payouts: 50

Legends of Poker
 Casino: The Bicycle Casino, Los Angeles, California
 Buy-in: $4,800 + 200
 6-Day Event: Aug 20 – 25, 2010
 Number of Entries: 462
 Total Prize Pool: $2,151,072
 Number of Payouts: 45

WPT London Poker Classic
 Casino: Palm Beach Casino, London, England
 Buy-in: £5000 +£300
 6-Day Event: August 30, 2010 to September 4, 2010
 Number of Entries: 171
 Total Prize Pool: £820,800
 Number of Payouts: 18

Borgata Poker Open
 Casino: Borgata, Atlantic City, New Jersey
 Buy-in: $3,300 + 200
 6-Day Event: Sep 19 – 24, 2010
 Number of Entries: 1042
 Total Prize Pool: $3,438,600
 Number of Payouts: 100

Festa al Lago
 Casino: Bellagio, Las Vegas, Nevada
 Buy-in: $10,000 + 300
 6-Day Event: Oct 15 – 20, 2010
 Number of Entries: 335
 Total Prize Pool: $3,224,000
 Number of Payouts: 50

Foxwoods World Poker Finals
 Casino: Foxwoods Resort Casino, Mashantucket, Connecticut
 Buy-in: $9,700 + 300
 6-Day Event: Oct 28 – Nov 2, 2010
 Number of Entries: 242
 Total Prize Pool: $2,276,978
 Number of Payouts: 25

WPT Amneville
 Casino: Casino Municipal D Amneville, Amnéville, France
 Buy-in: €3200 + €300
 5-Day Event: 2 Nov 2010 to 6 Nov 2010
 Number of Entries: 543
 Total Prize Pool: €1,640,000
 Number of Payouts: 54

WPT Marrakech
 Casino: Casino De Marrakech, Marrakech, Morocco
 Buy-in: €4,250 + 750
 4-Day Event: Nov 27 - 30, 2010
 Number of Entries:  222
 Total Prize Pool: €905,528
 Number of Payouts: 27

Doyle Brunson Five Diamond World Poker Classic
 Casino: Bellagio, Las Vegas, Nevada
 Buy-in: $10,000 + 300
 6-Day Event: Dec 3 – 8, 2010
 Number of Entries: 438
 Total Prize Pool: 4,261,267
 Number of Payouts: 100

WPT Southern Poker Championship
 Casino: Beau Rivage, Biloxi, Mississippi
 Buy-in: $9,700 + 300
 7-Day Event: Jan 23 – 27, 2011
 Number of Entries: 214
 Total Prize Pool: $2,011,600
 Number of Payouts: 27

WPT Venice
 Casino: Casino Di Venezia, Venice, Italy
 Buy-in: €3,000 + 300
 6-Day Event: Feb 3 – 8, 2011
 Number of Entries: 523
 Total Prize Pool: €1,521,930 
 Number of Payouts:

L.A. Poker Classic
 Casino: Commerce Casino, Los Angeles, California
 Buy-in:
 2-Day Event: February 19, 2011
 Number of Entries: 482
 Total Prize Pool:
 Number of Payouts:
 Winning Hand:

L.A. Poker Classic
 Casino: Commerce Casino, Los Angeles, California
 Buy-in: $9,600 + 400
 6-Day Event: Feb 25 – Mar 3, 2011
 Number of Entries: 681
 Total Prize Pool: $6,537,600
 Number of Payouts: 64

WPT Bay 101 Shooting Star
 Casino: Bay 101, San Jose, California
 Buy-in: $9,600 + 400
 5-Day Event: Mar 14 – Mar 18, 2011
 Number of Entries: 415
 Total Prize Pool: $3,942,500
 Number of Payouts: 45

WPT Vienna
 Casino: Montesino, Vienna, Austria
 Buy-in: €3,200 + 300
 5-Day Event: Mar 25 – 29, 2011
 Number of Entries: 555
 Total Prize Pool: 
 Number of Payouts: 54

WPT Bratislava
 Casino: Bratislava
 Buy-in:
 2-Day Event: March 30, 2011
 Number of Entries: 198
 Total Prize Pool:
 Number of Payouts:
 Winning Hand:

WPT Hollywood Poker Open
 Casino: Hollywood Casino, Lawrenceburg, Indiana
 Buy-in: $9,600 + 400
 5-Day Event: Apr 9 – Apr 13, 2011
 Number of Entries: 97
 Total Prize Pool: $911,800
 Number of Payouts: 12

Seminole Hard Rock Showdown
 Casino: Seminole Hard Rock Hotel and Casino, Hollywood, Florida
 Buy-in: $9,600 + 400
 5-Day Event: Apr 27 – May 3, 2011
 Number of Entries: 433
 Total Prize Pool: $4,156,800
 Number of Payouts: 45

WPT World Championship
 Casino: Bellagio, Las Vegas, Nevada
 Buy-in: $25,000 + 500
 7-Day Event: May 14, 2011 – May 20, 2011
 Number of Entries: 220
 Total Prize Pool: $5,309,500
 Number of Payouts: 27

Other Events
During season 9 of the WPT there were three special events that did not apply to the Player of the Year standings:
 The WPT Celebrity Invitational - February 19–20, 2011 - Commerce Casino - prelude to Event #14: L.A. Poker Classic
 The Silicon Valley Power Challenge - March 13, 2011 - Bay 101 Casino - prelude to Event #15: WPT Bay 101 Shooting Star
 The WPT World Championship Super High Roller - May 18–19, 2011 - Bellagio - coincident with end of Event #19: WPT World Championship

Season IX Player of the Year

Top 6 players, including ties.

References

World Poker Tour
2010 in poker
2011 in poker